Réka Nagy (born 9 November 1986 in Ajka, Hungary) is an Olympic swimmer from Hungary. She swam for Hungary at the 2008 Olympics in the 800 m freestyle.

She has also swum for Hungary at the World Championships in 2005 and the European Junior Championships in 2002.

References

1986 births
Living people
People from Ajka
Olympic swimmers of Hungary
Swimmers at the 2008 Summer Olympics
Hungarian female freestyle swimmers
Sportspeople from Veszprém County
20th-century Hungarian women
21st-century Hungarian women